Aldhair Fernando Molina Fabián (born 4 April 1999) is a Mexican professional footballer who plays as a defender.

References

External links
Aldhair Molina at Soccerway 
Aldhair Molina at Football Database EU

1999 births
Living people
Liga MX players
Mexican footballers
Club Puebla players
Association football defenders
Footballers from Guerrero
Sportspeople from Acapulco
Ascenso MX players
Liga Premier de México players
Tercera División de México players